The 2014 Seguros Bolívar Open Bogotá was a professional tennis tournament played on outdoor clay courts. It was the sixth edition of the tournament which was part of the 2014 ITF Women's Circuit, offering a total of $100,000+H in prize money. It took place in Bogotá, Colombia, on 11–17 August 2014.

Singles main draw entrants

Seeds 

 1 Rankings as of 4 August 2014

Other entrants 
The following players received wildcards into the singles main draw:
  Laura Arciniegas
  Yuliana Lizarazo
  Daniela Pedraza Novak
  María Paulina Pérez

The following players received entry from the qualifying draw:
  Alexa Guarachi
  Tatjana Maria
  Ana Paula Neffa de los Ríos
  Marcela Zacarías

Champions

Singles 

  Lara Arruabarrena def.  Johanna Larsson 6–1, 6–3

Doubles 

  Lara Arruabarrena /  Florencia Molinero def.  Melanie Klaffner /  Patricia Mayr-Achleitner 6–2, 6–0

External links 
 2014 Seguros Bolívar Open Bogotá at ITFtennis.com

2014
2014 ITF Women's Circuit
Clay court tennis tournaments
Tennis tournaments in Colombia
2014 in Colombian tennis